Kryer Mountain is a ridge in Pulaski county in the U.S. state of Arkansas. It is located in the northeastern foothills of the Ouachita Mountains near Roland between the Arkansas and Big Maumelle river valleys.

References 

Mountains of Arkansas